Cristian Gabriel Davilla Rivaz (born 7 July 1990) is a Peruvian footballer who plays as defense. He plays for Deportivo Municipal.

Club career
David began playing as a rookie in Universitario de Deportes for a year, before playing his second year in Carlos A. Mannucci. After a single year in the club, he made a return to Universitario.

Honors

Club 
Universitario de Deportes 
 Torneo Descentralizado (1): 2013
 Reservations Tournament (1): 2014

International 
U-20 Copa Libertadores (1): 2011

External links

1990 births
Living people
Footballers from Lima
Peruvian footballers
Club Universitario de Deportes footballers
Carlos A. Mannucci players
Sport Huancayo footballers
Alianza Atlético footballers
Real Garcilaso footballers
Unión Comercio footballers
Deportivo Municipal footballers
Peruvian Primera División players
Association football defenders